The Viasat Cup was a 2006 Danish football tournament, starting at the end of the Danish Superliga 2005–06. The tournament was held due to Denmark's failure to qualify for the 2006 FIFA World Cup, a tournament which had caused FIFA to demand that the Superliga ended on 14 May. Viasat, holding the broadcast rights to the Superliga, and "Divisionsforeningen" contrived the tournament, and the most matches were broadcast on Danish TV3+.

FC Nordsjælland won the final against Aalborg BK 3–1 on Aalborg Stadion, with AaB's Poul Hübertz scoring after just 40 seconds, but 25 minutes later Anders Due equalized. In second half were Due again in focus; after 54 minutes he had a shot on the bar, and 20 minutes he assisted Jukka Santala's goal to 1–2. In the 82nd Jonathan Richter made the result definitive.

The favorites to the title, F.C. Copenhagen and Brøndby IF, were beat in the quarter finals, by respectively the winners FC Nordsjælland and Esbjerg fB.

Seedings

Groups 
The draw was held on 12 March.

Tiebreakers, if necessary, are applied in the following order:
Cumulative goal difference in all group matches.
Total goals scored in all group matches.
Draw.

Group A

Group B

Group C

Group D

Quarterfinals 
The quarterfinals will be played on 25/26 May and 28/29 May.

|}

* The match ended 2–2 but the result was changed to 0–3 in favour of Esbjerg fB because Brøndby IF was using an illegal player.

Semifinals 
The semifinals will be played on 1 and 4 June.

|}

Final 
The final was played on 7 June.

Top goalscorers

External links 
Official website at onside.dk

Defunct football cup competitions in Denmark
2005–06 in Danish football